The Augmented Satellite Launch Vehicle or Advanced Satellite Launch Vehicle, also known as ASLV, was a small-lift launch vehicle five-stage solid-fuel rocket developed by the Indian Space Research Organisation (ISRO) to place 150 kg satellites into LEO. This project was started by India during the early 1980s to develop technologies needed for a payload to be placed into a geostationary orbit.  Its design was based on Satellite Launch Vehicle. ISRO did not have sufficient funds for both the Polar Satellite Launch Vehicle programme and the ASLV programme at the same time and the ASLV programme was terminated after the initial developmental flights. The payloads of ASLV were Stretched Rohini Satellites.

Vehicle
The ASLV was a five-stage vehicle. Two strap-on boosters acted as a first stage, with the core stage igniting after booster burn out.

At liftoff, the ASLV generated  of thrust. The height to diameter ratio of ASLV was very large which resulted in the vehicle being unstable in flight. This was compounded by the fact that many of the critical events during a launch like the core ignition and the booster separation happened at the Tropopause  where the dynamic loads on the launcher was at the maximum.

History
The ASLV made four launches, of which one was successful, two failed to achieve orbit, and a third achieved a lower than planned orbit which decayed quickly. The type made its maiden flight on 24 March 1987, and its final flight on 4 May 1994.

Launch statistics

Launch history
All four ASLV launches occurred from the ASLV Launch Pad at the Sriharikota Range. For vertically integrated ASLV, many SLV-3 ground facilities were reused but a new launch pad with retractable Mobile Service Structure was constructed within the same launch complex.

See also 
 
Comparison of orbital launchers families

References 

Space programme of India
Satish Dhawan Space Centre
ISRO space launch vehicles
Expendable space launch systems
Vehicles introduced in 1987